Crescent Lake is a  freshwater lake located in Putnam and Flagler counties in North Central Florida. At the north end it connects to St. Johns River by way of Dunn's Creek.

Geology
Crescent Lake has a long and narrow shape similar to a crescent.

History
Crescent Lake was formerly known as Dunn's Lake.

Search for wreckage of the Alligator
On December 9, 2008, a group of volunteers led by scientists from the Lighthouse Archaeological Maritime Program in St. Augustine, Florida searched the east side of Lake Crescent for the sunken wreckage of the Alligator.

External links
Lower St. Johns River Watershed and Lake Crescent Protection - Florida DEP

References

Crescent
Lakes of Putnam County, Florida
Lakes of Flagler County, Florida
Tributaries of the St. Johns River